Wukro (Tigrigna: ውቕሮ) (also known as Wukro Kilte Awulaelo; Tigrigna: ውቕሮ ክልተ ኣውላዕሎ) (also transliterated Wuqro; is a town and separate woreda in Tigray, Ethiopia. Wukro is located along Genfel River, in the Misraqawi (Eastern) zone of the Tigray region on the Asmara-Addis Ababa highway (Ethiopian Highway 2). Wukro is surrounded by Kilte Awulaelo woreda. The rock-hewn churches around Wukro are the town's most distinctive landmarks. In earlier sources the area is usually referred to as Dongolo (Ge'ez: ዶንጎሎ) before the foundation of Wukro as a modern town, after the name of the main village nearby, while the term Wukro just referred originally to the church area of Wuqro Cherqos which was situated within the land of Dongolo village. Due to the establishment of modern infrastructure, including a far-distance road, the area around Wuqro Cherqos evolved into a town by itself, thus separated from Dongolo and became an economic and administrative centre by itself. The town's name derives from the Tigrigna word for a structure carved from the living rock, Wukro.

History

Ancient 
Wukro has been inhabited for millennia. Archaeological digs have found inscriptions from between the sixth and eighth century B.C. The place is part of the ancient trade route (particularly for salt) linking the Red Sea with inner Ethiopia, all the way to Lasta. It is said to be the location of the tomb of seventh-century Ethiopian king who hosted Muhammed and his followers. It has many rock hewn churches. The place is named in many old Ge'ez sources, including those about the thirteenth-century Ethiopian king Lalibela,  the sixteenth-century king Zär'a Ya'eqob, and the seventeenth-century king Susenyos.

1600s

Francisco Álvares was the first European recorded to have visited Wukro, when in 1521 he stayed at the royal inn or Betenegush. His account also includes a description of Maryam Wukro church "made in a rock, hewn and wrought with the pickaxe, with three aisles and their supports made of the rock itself."

19th Century 
The next important European visit was in 1868 when Lieutenant-General Sir Robert Napier passed through the village on his way to Magdela where he defeated the Ethiopian Emperor Tewodros II. During their march through Wukro, members of the British army saw one of the Tigrayan rock-hewn churches, most likely Wukro Chirkos, and were afterwards thought to be the first Europeans to see these unusual structures; another notable landmark is the more recent church Wukro Giyorgis Bete.

20th Century 
During the Italian occupation, in 1938, there were shops and a hotel-restaurant, a car service station, a telephone and telegraph office and a health post.  It was qualified as an “Italian town under development”. Many of these buildings are still present, just south of the bridge. Francesco Baldassare started a mill in Wukro, but abandoned it when the Italians were defeated in 1941. Wukro was used as his headquarters by Blatta Haile Mariam Redda during the Woyane rebellion, until Ras Abebe Aregai captured the town 17 October 1943. Dawit W. Girgis reports in his memoirs that in 1964, with the permission of Emperor Haile Selassie, the Israelis operated a secret base outside Wukro where members of the Anyanya (a Sudanese rebel group) were trained in guerrilla warfare.

During the Ethiopian Civil War, Wukro was repeatedly attacked by Derg aircraft in 1988, resulting in the deaths of a total of 175 residents:
 On 8 April 1988: about 100 killed
 On 13 April 1988: 31 killed
 On 29-30 April 1988: 25 killed
 On 3 May 1988: 20 killed

21st Century 

Wukro was damaged heavily during the Tigray War. It was bombed in mid-November 2020, then shelled by artillery fire a few weeks later, resulting in heavy destruction of property and multiple civilian deaths. There was looting of public and private property leaving shops empty and the hospital 75% destroyed. Occupying soldiers engaged in sexual violence, extrajudicial killings, and detention of civilians through at least March 2021.

Economy 
Local industry includes Sheba Tannery, which is capable of processing 6,000 hides a day. Opened in 2004, the tannery is one of the 13 companies owned and managed by the Endowment Fund for the Rehabilitation of Tigray (EFFORT).

Kuwaiti Prime Minister Sheikh Nasser Mohammed Al-Ahmed Al-Sabah announced in July 2009, during a 3-day visit to Ethiopia, that his country would provide a $63 million loan to Ethiopia, part of which would be used to build a road between Wukro and Zalambessa near the Eritrean-Ethiopian border.

Demographics 
In 1938, the town counted 368 inhabitants (including 78 Italians).

Based on the 2007 national census conducted by the Central Statistical Agency, this town has a total population of 30,210, of whom 14,056 are men and 15,154 are women. A total of 9,383 households were counted in this town, resulting in an average of 3.22 persons to a household, and 8,993 housing units. The majority of the inhabitants said they practiced Ethiopian Orthodox Christianity, with 92.94% reporting that as their religion, while 6.03% of the population were Muslim.

The 1994 census reported the town had a total population of 16,421 of whom 7,427 were men and 8,994 were women. It is the largest settlement in Wukro woreda.

See also 

 Soil in Kilte Awula'ilo

Notes 

Populated places in the Tigray Region
Ethiopia
Cities and towns in Ethiopia